Gilbert Anthony "Rick" Foley (September 22, 1945 — September 29, 2015) was a Canadian professional ice hockey defenceman. He played 67 games in the National Hockey League with the Chicago Black Hawks, Philadelphia Flyers, and Detroit Red Wings between 1971 and 1973 and 11 games in the World Hockey Association with the Toronto Toros in 1975 and 1976. The rest of his career, which lasted from 1966 to 1978, was spent in the minor leagues.

Playing career
During the game of December 15, 1971, Foley simultaneously fought both Jim Neilson and Glen Sather. The fight lasted about 30 seconds and was one of the rare times one player fought two. Foley was given a decision against both by those who witnessed the event. The two Ranger players received fighting majors while Foley only received one. Foley also received a game misconduct from referee Ron Wicks for reasons that remain unclear. He died on September 29, 2015.

Career statistics

Regular season and playoffs

References

External links
 

1945 births
2015 deaths
Baltimore Clippers players
Canadian ice hockey defencemen
Charlotte Checkers (EHL) players
Chicago Blackhawks players
Dallas Black Hawks players
Detroit Red Wings players
Ice hockey people from Ontario
Ontario Hockey Association Senior A League (1890–1979) players
Oshawa Generals players
Philadelphia Flyers players
Portland Buckaroos players
Richmond Robins players
San Diego Gulls (WHL) players
Sportspeople from Niagara Falls, Ontario
Syracuse Eagles players
Toronto Toros players